Gábor Tardos (born 11 July 1964) is a Hungarian mathematician, currently a professor at Central European University and previously a Canada Research Chair at Simon Fraser University. He works mainly in combinatorics and computer science. He is the younger brother of Éva Tardos.

Education and career 
Gábor Tardos received his PhD in Mathematics from Eötvös University, Budapest in 1988. His counsellors were László Babai and Péter Pálfy. He held postdoctoral posts at the University of Chicago, Rutgers University, University of Toronto and the Princeton Institute for Advanced Study. From 2005 to 2013, he served as a Canada Research Chair of discrete and computational geometry at Simon Fraser University. He then returned to Budapest to the Alfréd Rényi Institute of Mathematics where he has served as a research fellow since 1991.

Mathematical results
Tardos started with a result in universal algebra: he exhibited a maximal clone of order-preserving operations that is not finitely generated. He obtained partial results concerning the Hanna Neumann conjecture. With his student, Adam Marcus, he proved a combinatorial conjecture of Zoltán Füredi and Péter Hajnal that was known to imply the Stanley–Wilf conjecture. Tardos worked out a method for optimal probabilistic fingerprint codes. Although the mathematical content is hard, the algorithm is easy to implement.

Awards
He received the European Mathematical Society prize for young researchers at the European Congress of Mathematics in 1992 and the Prize of the Hungarian Academy of Sciences for Young Researchers. In 1999 he received the Erdős Prize from the Hungarian Academy of Sciences and the Alfréd Rényi Prize of the Alfréd Rényi Institute of Mathematics.

He received a Lendület Grant from the Hungarian Academy of Sciences (2009) specifically devised to keep outstanding researchers in Hungary. In 2020, he received the Gödel Prize for the algorithmic version of the Lovász local lemma that he developed together with Robin Moser.

In 2018, Tardos was an invited speaker at the International Congress of Mathematicians in Rio de Janeiro.

Selected publications
.
.
.
.

References

External links

1964 births
Living people
Hungarian computer scientists
Combinatorialists
20th-century Hungarian mathematicians
21st-century Hungarian mathematicians
Hungarian Jews
Academic staff of Simon Fraser University
Canada Research Chairs
International Mathematical Olympiad participants